Andrafainkona is a town and commune in northern Madagascar. It belongs to the district of Vohemar, which is a part of Sava Region. The population of the commune was estimated to be approximately 5,000 in 2001 commune census.

Only primary schooling is available. The majority 99% of the population of the commune are farmers.  The most important crops are rice and vanilla, while other important agricultural products are coffee and beans.  Services provide employment for 1% of the population.

References and notes 

Populated places in Sava Region